Glynor Plet (born 30 January 1987) is a Dutch professional footballer who plays as a striker for Eerste Divisie club SC Telstar. He previously played for FC Den Bosch, Telstar, Heracles Almelo, Genk, FC Twente, Hapoel Be'er Sheva F.C, Go Ahead Eagles Zulte Waregem and Alanyaspor.

Club career

Telstar
In the 2009–10 season, Plet was one of the revelations in the Dutch second division. Partly because of the many goals he made for the club, Telstar won the period title for the first time in years. The then 23-year-old striker played 73 league matches for Telstar, scoring 39 goals.

Heracles Almelo
On 27 May 2010, Glynor Plet signed a contract for three years with an option for another year with Heracles Almelo to succeed Bas Dost, who had left to SC Heerenveen. Glynor Plet scored two goals for Heracles on his Eredivsie debut against Willem II in a 3–0 home victory on 7 August 2010. He scored a total of 7 goals in 22 matches in his first season for the club. He aroused interest of FC Twente by scoring 10 goals in 19 matches in the 2011–12 season.

FC Twente
As a result, Plet signed a 3.5 years contract with FC Twente in the transfer window of January 2012. He was supposed to succeed Marc Janko as the competitor of Luuk de Jong. He made his debut for the club against his last club Heracles Almelo. However, he could never meet the expectations and was told he could leave the club in the summer of 2012.

Racing Genk
On 31 August 2012, Plet was sent on loan to Belgian Pro League side Racing Genk Although he did not make it often to the first eleven, he yet scored 10 goals in 27 matches during the 2012–13 season. He won the Belgian Cup with the club by beating Cercle Brugge in the final. In his last match for the club, against SC Lokeren, he made his one hundred goal in his career. However, Genk did not decide to sign Plet permanently.

Hapoel Be'er Sheva
Plet signed a contract in Hapoel Be'er Sheva for two years on 20 September 2013. Even though many critics didn't give him a shot, he scored 9 league goals for Hapoel Be'er Sheva, established himself as one of the best strikers in the Israeli Winner League. 
Plet's debut goal in the Winner League was against Bnei Yehuda, in his debut game on Be'er Sheva's late win 2–1.

Zulte Waregem
On 9 July 2014, Plet returned to Belgium by signing a deal with Zulte Waregem He made his debut for the club in the 2–0 won match against KV Kortrijk on 27 July 2014. In half a season he only scored twice in 18 matches for the club and was told that he could leave the club in the following transfer window.

Go Ahead Eagles
On 29 January 2015, Plet was sent on loan to Dutch Eredivisie side Go Ahead Eagles for the rest of the season.

Maccabi Haifa
On 7 September 2015, Plet returned to Israel and signed a two-year contract with Maccabi Haifa. On 12 September, he made his debut against Bnei Sakhnin, coming on as a substitute in the 69th minute, he was sent off by a red card in injury time.

Personal life
Born in the Netherlands, Plet is of Surinamese descent.

Honours

Club
Genk
Belgian Cup (1): 2012-13

Maccabi Haifa
Israel State Cup (1): 2015–16

References

External links
 Glynor Plet at Voetbal International
 Hapoel Be'er Sheva Official Site
 Glynor Plet Interview

1987 births
Living people
Association football forwards
Footballers from Amsterdam
Dutch footballers
Dutch expatriate footballers
Dutch sportspeople of Surinamese descent
FC Den Bosch players
SC Telstar players
Heracles Almelo players
FC Twente players
K.R.C. Genk players
Hapoel Be'er Sheva F.C. players
S.V. Zulte Waregem players
Go Ahead Eagles players
Maccabi Haifa F.C. players
Alanyaspor footballers
SV Argon players
FC Lisse players
Belgian Pro League players
Eredivisie players
Eerste Divisie players
Israeli Premier League players
Süper Lig players
Expatriate footballers in Belgium
Dutch expatriate sportspeople in Belgium
Expatriate footballers in Israel
Dutch expatriate sportspeople in Israel
Expatriate footballers in Turkey